Jeong Da-bin (March 4, 1980 – February 10, 2007) was a South Korean actress. Best known for the popular television series Cats on the Roof, she died through suicide in 2007 at the age of 26.

Career
Born Jeong Hye-seon in Seongnam, Gyeonggi Province, she studied Theater and Film at Dongguk University. Using the stage name Jeong Da-bin, she made her acting debut in 2000 in The Legend of Gingko. This was followed by minor and supporting roles in television dramas, and as part of the ensemble cast in the sitcom Nonstop.

In 2003, Jeong's acting breakthrough would come in Cats on the Roof. Depicting a boy and a girl platonically living together then falling in love (with cohabitation at the time a taboo topic in the South Korean mainstream), the series was a success, especially popular among teenagers and those in their early to mid 20s.

Jeong became known for her cheerful and positive image, and in 2004 having starred in her first film, the romantic comedy He Was Cool alongside Song Seung-heon, based on the internet novel by Guiyeoni. She then returned to television, starring with Yoon Kye-sang in My 19 Year Old Sister-in-Law. In 2005, That Summer's Typhoon, which co-starred Han Ye-seul, would be her final acting role, although it did not perform well.

Subsequent depression and death
On February 10, 2007, Jeong was found hanged with a bath towel in the bathroom of her boyfriend's house in Samseong-dong, Gangnam District, southern Seoul. Her boyfriend, identified by his surname Lee, said he took Jeong back to his house because she got drunk while socializing with friends at a nearby bar in Cheongdam-dong. Lee, who discovered her body at 7:50 a.m. and called the police, said the actress had been recently depressed due to a lack of work, the imprisonment of her previous manager, and malicious attacks on the Internet about her physical appearance. Lee also said Jeong first attempted suicide by slitting her wrist between September and October 2006. Her talent agency disputed this, claiming her wrist scar was the result of an accident that occurred in her first year of high school. Suspecting foul play, her family and agency requested an investigation, and the postmortem concluded that it was suicide.

Although no apparent suicide note was left behind, Jeong had posted her thoughts on her personal blog on Cyworld just a day prior to her death. Under the title "The End" (or "Finished"), she wrote:  

She was cremated, and her remains placed at Cheonga Park in Ilsan, Gyeonggi Province. Jeong's death, which was shortly after singer U;Nee's suicide in January 2007, sent shock waves throughout South Korea and sparked concern over copycat suicides.

Filmography

Television drama
 Money.com (SBS, 2000)
 The Full Sun (KBS2, 2000)
 New Nonstop (MBC, 2001)
 TV Novel "Hongeo"  (KBS1, 2001)
 How Should I Be? (MBC, 2001)
 Trio (2002)
 Nonstop 3 (MBC, 2003)
 Cats on the Roof (MBC, 2003)
 My 19 Year Old Sister-in-Law (SBS, 2004)
 That Summer's Typhoon (SBS, 2005)

Film
 The Legend of Gingko (2000)
  He Was Cool (2004)

Music video
 Baek Ji-young – "I Won't Love" (2006)

Awards 
 2002 MBC Entertainment Awards: Top Excellence Award, Actress in a Sitcom/Comedy (New Nonstop)
 2003 MBC Drama Awards: Best New Actress (Cats on the Roof)
 2004 SBS Drama Awards: New Star Award (My 19 Year Old Sister-in-Law)

See also 
Suicide in South Korea

References

External links 
 
 
 
 

1980 births
2007 deaths
Female suicides
People from Seongnam
South Korean film actresses
South Korean television actresses
Suicides by hanging in South Korea
2007 suicides